The Schrattenkalk Formation is a Barremian to Aptian geologic formation in the Alps. The limestone is highly karstified. Fossil ornithopod tracks have been reported from the formation. Iguanodont tracks have been registered in the Swiss portion of the formation. The famous north face of the Eiger is partly composed of Schrattenkalk, as well as the Sturmannshöhle in southernmost Bavaria, Germany, and the Hölloch (second-longest cave in Europe) and Silberen system karst caves in Switzerland.

Description 
The formation is named after the Schrattenfluh in Luzern, Switzerland. The name is derived from the Swiss-German "Schratten" (a synonym of Karren) meaning clints or lapies, a phenomenon that frequently affects the limestone. Kalk is limestone in German. Synonyms for the extensive formation are Hieroglyphenkalk, Calcaire à Hippurites, Urgonien, Rudistenkalk, Urgo-Aptien, Schrattenschichten, Requienenkalk, Rhodanien, Caprotinenkalk, and Urgonian Limestone. The formation consists of three units, the Lower Schrattenkalk, Rawil Member and Upper Schrattenkalk.

The upper and lower units consist mostly of reefal limestones with bryozoa, gastropods, corals, sponges, brachiopods, bivalves and rudists. The Rawil Member contains beds of sandstones and mudstones containing foraminifera and echinoderms. The upper and lower members represent a photozoan-dominated carbonate platform, and was deposited at the northern edge of the Tethys Ocean.

Fossil content 
In 2015, two new corals were described from Austria; Cairnsipsammia, and Paraclausastrea vorarlbergensis.

In an abandoned quarry on the shore of Lake Lucerne, close to the village of Beckenried, fossil trackways were discovered in the formation. The steeply inclined surface has more than 50 tracks (in three trackways) of ornithopod dinosaurs that are attributed to iguanodontids.

Panorama

See also 
 List of dinosaur-bearing rock formations
 List of stratigraphic units with ornithischian tracks
 Ornithopod tracks
 Geology of the Alps

References

Bibliography

Further reading 
 
 Kristina Schenk: Die Drusberg- und Schrattenkalk-Formation (Unterkreide) im Helvetikum des Berner Oberlandes. Dissertation Universität Bern, 1992
 

Geologic formations of Austria
Geologic formations of Germany
Geologic formations of Switzerland
Cretaceous Europe
Aptian Stage
Barremian Stage
Limestone formations
Ichnofossiliferous formations
Geology of the Alps